William Caldwell ( – 20 February 1822) was an Irish-born military officer and colonial official in the British Indian Department.  He fought against the Patriots in the American Revolutionary War, especially with Butler's Rangers, based near upstate New York. After the war, together with other Loyalists, Caldwell was granted land in Upper Canada (now Ontario).  He helped found the town of Amherstburg, near the mouth of the Detroit River. He also served as a lieutenant colonel in the War of 1812, and as the Superintendent of Indians in the Western Department. He was a merchant and farmer in Amherstburg.

Early life
Caldwell is believed to be the son of William and Rebecka Caldwell of County Fermanagh, Ireland. As a young man, he immigrated to Pennsylvania in the Thirteen Colonies in 1773.

Military career
His initiation into combat was in the Wyoming Valley of Pennsylvania when Pennsylvanians fought against Connecticut settlers. In 1774, he served in Lord Dunmore's War. In 1775, he was appointed an officer in the British Indian Department.

With the outbreak of the American Revolutionary War, Caldwell served with Lord Dunmore's forces in the attack on Norfolk, Virginia, in 1776, and was injured. After recovering from wounds, Caldwell went to Fort Niagara where he was appointed captain in Butler's Rangers on 24 December 1777.

In the ranger campaigns, Caldwell was "a very active Partisan", according to the commandant of Fort Niagara. Leading his troops into battle, he exhibited a ruthlessness that the Americans would never forget. On 3 July 1778, he was present at the Battle of Wyoming in Pennsylvania. In September 1778 he led an attack on German Flatts in the Mohawk Valley of central New York, together with Mohawk Chief Joseph Brant leading his Iroquois forces. They destroyed all of the buildings and grain in the area, and killed and captured much livestock, leaving the settlers struggling through the winter.

Based out of Detroit, Caldwell led a force of about 50 rangers in many battles and expeditions in Kentucky and the Ohio Country. In 1782, he led his rangers and Shawnee allies in a victory over the Crawford expedition; they went on to lose a battle at Bryan Station and then succeed at the Battle of Blue Licks.

After the war, Caldwell settled in the Detroit region that became Upper Canada. Together with other Loyalists, he was granted land in what became Amherstburg on the Detroit River and became a merchant. His partner was another Loyalist, Matthew Elliott.

During the Northwest Indian War, he led a company (80–150 men) of Canadian militia alongside Northwestern Confederacy Natives against advancing American troops at Fallen Timbers, the final engagement of the war.

With the outbreak of the War of 1812, Caldwell was commissioned a lieutenant colonel and given command of a group of between 40 and 50 volunteers from the Canadian militia, called Caldwell's Rangers (or the Western Rangers). He fought at the Battle of the Thames and the Battle of Longwoods, among many other actions. He gained commissions for all his sons in the regular army.

After the death of Matthew Elliot in April 1814, Caldwell was appointed Superintendent of Indians in the Western District, with his son Billy as his second-in-command.

William Caldwell died on 20 February 1822 in Amherstburg, Upper Canada.

Marriage and family
Before his marriage, while in Fort Niagara, Caldwell had a relationship with a Mohawk woman. They named their son, born about 1782, Billy Caldwell. The boy was first raised with his mother's people.

In 1783 Caldwell married Suzanne Baby, daughter of Jacques Baby dit Dupéron. Together they had eight children, five sons and three daughters.

In 1789 his father brought the boy Billy Caldwell into his family and gave him an education. Billy became William Caldwell's second-in-command in the British Indian Department. Billy later lived in the United States after 1818, where he became a prominent representative of the Potawatomi people in Illinois and Iowa. He was sometimes known to them as Sauganash, their term for a British Canadian.

References

Further reading
Horsman, Reginald. Matthew Elliott, British Indian Agent. Detroit, 1964.

External links
Biography at the Dictionary of Canadian Biography Online

1750 births
1822 deaths
British Indian Department
Loyalists in the American Revolution from Pennsylvania
Loyalist military personnel of the American Revolutionary War
British Army personnel of the War of 1812
Irish soldiers
People of colonial Pennsylvania
Baby family (Canada)
British people of the War of 1812
British military personnel of the War of 1812
Canadian people of the War of 1812
Canadian Militia officers
People in Dunmore's War
People of the Northwest Indian War